Baskaki is a rural locality (a selo) in Bogolyubovskoye Rural Settlement, Suzdalsky District, Vladimir Oblast, Russia. The population was 12 as of 2010. There are 15 streets.

Geography 
Baskaki is located 46 km southeast of Suzdal (the district's administrative centre) by road. Ramenye is the nearest rural locality.

References 

Rural localities in Suzdalsky District
Vladimirsky Uyezd